Mark Shostrom (born May 13, 1956) is a special makeup effects artist for the film industry.

Background
Shostrom grew up in Hong Kong during the 1970s.  He became interested in makeup after seeing The Bride of Frankenstein (1935). Shostrom was encouraged to pursue makeup as a 13-year-old boy after befriending Evelyn Karloff, widow of Boris Karloff, the actor who portrayed the original Frankenstein's monster.

He is the winner of three Emmy Awards (out of four nominations) and has been nominated for four Saturn Awards by the Academy of Science Fiction, Fantasy and Horror Films. Shostrom designed and created special makeup effects for numerous cult horror films of the 1980s and 1990s, in particular the film series and sequels of A Nightmare on Elm Street, Phantasm and Evil Dead II.  He also contributed special makeup effects to music videos for "Pet Sematary" The Ramones and Nine Inch Nails.

Partial filmography

References

External links
 Mark Shostrom's Official Site

1956 births
American make-up artists
Emmy Award winners
Living people
Special effects people